This is a list of the gymnasts who represented their respective countries at the 2020 Summer Olympics in Tokyo, Japan from  24 July – 8 August 2021. Gymnasts across three disciplines (artistic gymnastics, rhythmic gymnastics and trampoline) participated in the Games.

Male artistic gymnasts

Team

Individual

Female artistic gymnasts

Team

Individual

Rhythmic gymnasts

Individual

Group

Male trampoline gymnasts

Female trampoline gymnasts

Notes

References 

Lists of gymnasts
Gymnastics at the 2020 Summer Olympics
Lists of competitors at the 2020 Summer Olympics